Zeynep Asima Sultan ("Jewel of the father" and "defender";  8 April 1720 – 25 March 1774) was an Ottoman princess, the daughter of Sultan Ahmed III.

Birth
Zeynep Sultan was born in the 8 April 1720 in the Topkapı Palace. Her father was Sultan Ahmed III.

First marriage
In 1728, Zeynep Sultan married (Küçük) Sinek Mustafa Pasha, the nephew of the grand vezir Nevşehirli Damat Ibrahim Pasha, and the second head of the royal stables at the time. The wedding ceremony took place at the Topkapı Palace. On 8 December Zeynep's trousseau was sent to her palace known as Kıbleli Palace and the next day the wedding procession took place. Together, they had a son.

Second marriage
After the death of Mustafa Pasha in 1764, Zeynep Sultan in 1765 married Melek Mehmed Pasha, who had previously served as the grand admiral of the Ottoman fleet, during the reign of her half-brother Mustafa III. Melek Mehmed Pasha served as the Admiral of the Fleet for two times and was made grand vizier in 1792.

Issue 
By her first marriage, Zeynep had a son:

 Sultanzade Yüsuf Bey (1732 - 1765)

Charities
In 1769, Zeynep Sultan endowed a mosque at Eminönü known as "Ruh-i Sultaniye Mosque". A school and a fountain build near the mosque is also part of the foundation. Today it is called Zeynep Sultan Mosque.

Death
Zeynep Sultan died on 25 March 1774 and was buried in her own mosque located at Eminönü.

Ancestry

References

Sources
 

1715 births
1774 deaths
18th-century Ottoman princesses
1714 births